Canadian Forces Training Command was an early component of the Canadian Forces after unification of the military in 1968.

This command was charged with training of pilots for the entire Canadian Forces after unification. It was eliminated in the simplification of the CF structure in 1975 and now under command of the Royal Canadian Air Force. Training is assigned to individual Squadrons of the RCAF.

Squadrons

 403 Squadron Helicopter Operational Training Squadron - 1 Wing Kingston
 404 Squadron Maritime Patrol and Training Squadron - 14 Wing Greenwood
 406 Squadron Maritime Operational Training Squadron - 12 Wing Shearwater
 410 Squadron Tactical Fighter Training Squadron - 4 Wing Cold Lake
 419 Squadron Tactical Fighter Training Squadron - 4 Wing Cold Lake
 426 Squadron Transport Training Squadron - 8 Wing Trenton
 441 Squadron Tactical Training Squadron - 4 Wing Cold Lake

Aircraft

 Canadair CF-5
 Beechcraft Musketeer
 Canadair CL-41 Tutor
 Canadair CF-104
 CF-101 Voodoo
 T-33 Shooting Star

References

Canadian Armed Forces
Canadian armed forces air commands
Military education and training in Canada
Training units and formations of air forces